Eriorhynchus womersleyi is a species in the genus of Eriorhynchus.

References 

Animals described in 1997
Trombidiformes genera